The 2020–23 ICC Men's Cricket World Cup Super League is the ongoing inaugural edition of the ICC Cricket World Cup Super League, a One Day International (ODI) league. The league is taking place from July 2020 to May 2023, and serves as part of the 2023 Cricket World Cup qualification process.

The league features thirteen teams, the twelve Full Members of the International Cricket Council (ICC), and the Netherlands, who won the 2015–17 ICC World Cricket League Championship to qualify for this competition. Each team will play an ODI series against eight of the other twelve teams, four series at home and four away. Each series consists of three ODIs.

The COVID-19 pandemic affected the start of the league, with several series of matches being postponed. In April 2020, following a Chief Executives' meeting, the ICC announced that it would look at the future of the league at a later date, once there is a better understanding of the impact of the pandemic on cricket. The series between England and Ireland, starting 30 July 2020, were the first matches of the league. In March 2022, as a result of the impact from the pandemic, the ICC agreed to extend the cut-off date for the tournament until May 2023, allowing the series between Ireland and Bangladesh to take place.

Following a trial that started in December 2019, the ICC announced the use of technology to monitor front-foot no-balls for all matches in the Super League. The third umpire called the front-foot no-balls, communicating with the on-field umpires.

Teams and qualification pathway

Thirteen teams qualified:

Full Members of the ICC:

Winners of the 2015-2017 ICC Cricket World Cricket League Championship

For the World Cup, the hosts, and the top seven sides thereafter, will qualify automatically. The remaining five teams will play in a qualifying event—the 2023 Cricket World Cup Qualifier—along with five Associate sides, from which two sides will go through to the World Cup.

The top twelve teams in this Super League remain in the Super League for the next World Cup cycle. The 13th ranked team in this Super League and the champions of the 2019–22 ICC Cricket World Cup League 2 will take part in World Cup Qualifier, where the better team will take the 13th spot in the next Super League while the team ranked lower will play in the next League 2.

Format 
The tournament is a partial round-robin league and will be played over two years. Each team will play eight other opponents, four at home and four away, in series consisting of three ODI matches. This means that a given team will not face all other opponents in their group, but all teams will play the same number of matches ( i.e., 12 matches at home and 12 matches away).

Points are awarded as follows:

 Win – 10 points
 No result or abandoned – 5 points
 Loss – 0 points

 If a match is abandoned and the pitch or outfield is declared unfit by the ICC Pitch and Outfield Monitoring Process, then the match will be awarded to the visiting team.
 A team that is behind the required over-rate at the end of a match will have one competition point deducted for each over it is behind.
 Tied matches will be decided by a Super Over. If a Super Over is a tie, subsequent Super Overs shall be played until there is a winner.

Schedule 
The match schedule was announced by the ICC on 20 June 2018 as part of the 2018–23 ICC Future Tours Programme.

1Australia withdrew from these matches against Afghanistan.
2South Africa withdrew from these matches against Australia.
3The first of the three matches in this series was played in November 2021. The remaining two are scheduled for March–April 2023.

The four teams that each side were not scheduled to face in the tournament was as follows:

COVID-19 pandemic

The COVID-19 pandemic began before the start of the league, which was originally scheduled for May 2020 to March 2022, and resulted in no international cricket being played from March to July 2020. All Super League fixtures scheduled for 2020 were postponed or rescheduled with considerations for pandemic-related restrictions. Fixtures had to be reconsidered to account for the disruptions to the schedule.

Bangladesh's matches against Ireland were postponed on 21 March 2020. In April 2020, South Africa's tour to Sri Lanka was postponed. The same month, Pakistan's tour of the Netherlands and the West Indies tour of the Netherlands were both postponed, after the Dutch government banned all events in the country, both sports and cultural, until 1 September 2020. On 15 May 2020, Cricket Ireland confirmed that the tour by New Zealand had also been postponed. On 12 June 2020, the Board of Control for Cricket in India (BCCI) confirmed that it had called off their tours to Zimbabwe and Sri Lanka. On 30 June, Cricket Australia confirmed that their planned home series against Zimbabwe had also been postponed due to the virus. New Zealand's tour of the West Indies was postponed, after the fixtures clashed with the West Indies rescheduled tour to England. In August 2020, the Netherlands' tour of the Zimbabwe was cancelled due to the pandemic.

The first matches of the Super League were Ireland's 3-match ODI series in England which were originally scheduled for September 2020 but brought forward to July and August with all three matches taking place in Southampton. Australia's tour of England, which was originally to take place in July 2020, was postponed and took place in September 2020. England's tour of South Africa was postponed following an outbreak of COVID-19 among members of both teams and the hotel staff.

In December, the ICC rescheduled the postponed series to a new schedule which would end in March 2023.

League table

In the event that one or more teams have the same number of points, the following tie-breaking procedure is used:

 The team that has won the greater number of matches will be placed higher.
 If still equal, the team with the higher net run rate will be placed higher.
 If still equal, the team that is ranked in the higher position in the ICC Men's ODI Team Rankings on 1 July 2020 shall be placed higher.

Fixtures

2020

England v Ireland 

This series was originally scheduled for September 2020 but was rescheduled due to the COVID-19 pandemic.

England v Australia 

This series was originally scheduled for July 2020 but was rescheduled due to the COVID-19 pandemic.

2020–21

Pakistan v Zimbabwe 

This series was originally scheduled to begin in November 2020.

Australia v India

Bangladesh v West Indies

Afghanistan v Ireland

West Indies v Sri Lanka

New Zealand v Bangladesh

India v England 

This series was originally scheduled for September 2020. However, with the IPL being rescheduled to September–November 2020, this series was postponed to March 2021.

South Africa v Pakistan 

This series was originally scheduled for October 2020 but was rescheduled due to the COVID-19 pandemic.

2021

Bangladesh v Sri Lanka 

This series was originally scheduled for December 2020 but was rescheduled due to the COVID-19 pandemic.

Netherlands v Ireland

England v Sri Lanka

England v Pakistan

Ireland v South Africa

Zimbabwe v Bangladesh

Sri Lanka v India 

This series was originally scheduled for June 2020 but was rescheduled to July 2021 due to the COVID-19 pandemic.

West Indies v Australia

Ireland v Zimbabwe

2021–22

Sri Lanka v South Africa 

This series was originally scheduled for June 2020 but was postponed due to the COVID-19 pandemic.

South Africa v Netherlands

West Indies v Ireland

Sri Lanka v Zimbabwe 

This series was originally scheduled for October 2020 but was postponed due to the COVID-19 pandemic.

Afghanistan v Netherlands

India v West Indies

Bangladesh v Afghanistan

South Africa v Bangladesh

New Zealand v Netherlands

Pakistan v Australia

2022

Netherlands v West Indies 

This series was originally scheduled for July 2020 but was postponed due to the COVID-19 pandemic.

Zimbabwe v Afghanistan 

The series was scheduled for February 2022. It was postponed in January 2022 after Zimbabwe Cricket could not secure all the broadcasting services including the Decision Review System. It was subsequently rescheduled for June 2022.

Pakistan v West Indies 

The matches were originally scheduled to be played in December 2021, but were postponed after multiple cases of COVID-19 were confirmed in the West Indies team and support staff.

Netherlands v England 

The tour was originally scheduled for May 2021 but was postponed by a year.

Ireland v New Zealand 

This series was originally scheduled for June 2020 but was postponed due to the COVID-19 pandemic.

Netherlands v Pakistan 

This series was originally scheduled for July 2020 but was postponed due to the COVID-19 pandemic. It was subsequently rescheduled for August 2022.

West Indies v New Zealand 

This series was originally scheduled for July 2020 but was postponed due to the COVID-19 pandemic. It was subsequently rescheduled for August 2022.

Zimbabwe v India 

This series was originally scheduled for August 2020 but was postponed due to the COVID-19 pandemic. It was subsequently rescheduled for August 2022.

Australia v Zimbabwe 

This series was originally scheduled for August 2020 but was postponed due to the COVID-19 pandemic. It was subsequently rescheduled to August 2022.

2022–23

Australia v New Zealand (Chappell–Hadlee Trophy) 

This series was originally scheduled for January–February 2021 but was postponed due to the COVID-19 pandemic until the 2021–22 season. However, the tour was postponed in January 2022 due to the uncertainty of the quarantine rules for when the New Zealand team return home. It was subsequently scheduled for September 2022.

India v South Africa

New Zealand v India 

India's tour of New Zealand was postponed due to a packed calendar and COVID-19 related restrictions. The tour was subsequently rescheduled to follow the 2022 ICC Men's T20 World Cup in November 2022. On 28 June 2022, New Zealand Cricket confirmed the dates for the tour.

Sri Lanka v Afghanistan 

Afghanistan's tour of Sri Lanka was originally rescheduled for January 2023, but it was subsequently announced that the games would take place in November 2022.

2023

Pakistan v New Zealand

South Africa v England 

This series was originally scheduled for March–April 2020 but was rescheduled to December 2020 due to the COVID-19 pandemic. England's tour of South Africa was then disrupted in December 2020, following an outbreak of COVID-19 among members of both teams and the hotel staff.

Bangladesh v England 

This series was originally scheduled for September 2021 but was postponed in August 2021. On 3 August 2021, ECB confirmed that the tour has been re-arranged for March 2023. On 27 August 2022, both the cricket boards confirmed the fixtures of the tour.

Zimbabwe v Netherlands 

This series was originally scheduled for September 2020 but was postponed due to the COVID-19 pandemic.

New Zealand v Sri Lanka 

This series was originally scheduled for February 2021 but was postponed due to the COVID-19 pandemic. On 28 June 2022, New Zealand Cricket confirmed that the tour had been re-arranged for March 2023.

Ireland v Bangladesh 

This series was originally scheduled for May 2020 but was postponed due to the COVID-19 pandemic.

Statistics

Most runs

Most wickets

Highest individual score

Best bowling figures in an innings

Team statistics

Highest team totals

Lowest team totals

Highest successful run-chases

See also 

 2021–2023 ICC World Test Championship
 2019–2023 ICC Cricket World Cup League 2
 2019–2022 ICC Cricket World Cup Challenge League

References

Notes

External links 
 Official website
 Tournament home on ESPNcricinfo

One Day International cricket competitions
ICC Cricket World Cup Super League
ICC Cricket World Cup Super League
ICC Cricket World Cup Super League
Super League
Current cricket seasons